Gagea chrysantha is a European species of plants in the lily family, found only in Sicily, Italy. Similar populations from the eastern Mediterranean have long been referred to G. chrysantha but recent evidence suggests that this group is actually a complex of several species rather than a single species.

Gagea chrysantha is a bulb-forming herb with yellow flowers.

References

chrysantha
Endemic flora of Italy
Plants described in 1829